Noyelles is a railway station serving the town Noyelles-sur-Mer, Somme department, northern France. It is served by mainline trains on the Boulogne - Abbeville line, and also by the Chemin de Fer de la Baie de Somme heritage railway trains to Le Crotoy, Saint-Valery-sur-Somme and Cayeux-sur-Mer.

History
Noyelles station opened in 1845 when the Chemin de Fer du Nord standard gauge line between Boulogne, Pas-de-Calais and Amiens, Somme opened.

In 1858, a  standard gauge branch to St. Valery Quai was opened. Extension of the line was desired in the 1880s, but it was considered that it would be too expensive to build the line as standard gauge. Instead, the extensions were to be laid with metre gauge track. A  extension to Le Crotoy opened on 1 July 1887. A  metre gauge line to Cayeux-sur-Mer opened on 6 September 1887. This line was laid as a dual gauge line as far as St. Valery, with the metre gauge rails laid between the standard gauge rails. The whole system became known as the Réseau des Bains de Mer.

The line to Forest l'Abbaye closed to passengers on 10 March 1947, but remained open for freight until 1 February 1951, although there was occasional traffic on the line until 1965. The line to Le Crotoy closed on 31 December 1969 and that to Cayeux on 31 December 1972. by which time the line to Le Crotoy had reopened as a heritage railway. The line to Cayeux was subsequently reopened as a heritage railway, and the two lines operate as the Chemin de Fer de la Baie de Somme. The standard gauge line to St. Valery was operated by SNCF until 6 February 1989 and officially closed from 1 January 1993.

Services

References

External links

Chemins de Fer de la Baie de Somme website

Railway stations in Somme (department)
Railway stations in France opened in 1845